The 2015 Gran Premio Nobili Rubinetterie was the 18th and final edition of the Gran Premio Nobili Rubinetterie one-day cycling classic, organised by the Associazione Ciclista Arona. The race took place on 19 March 2015. For the only time in the race's history, it was rated as a 1.HC race as part of the 2015 UCI Europe Tour; all previous editions were at the lower 1.1 rank. The defending champion from the 2014 edition was Simone Ponzi, who also won the race in 2011. The race took place around Lake Maggiore in the Italian region of Piedmont, finishing in the town of Stresa.

A large group broke away from the peloton after . There were late attacks from riders including Alejandro Valverde and Davide Rebellin, but these were controlled by the sprinters' teams. The race was won in the sprint by Giacomo Nizzolo ahead of Ponzi, with Marco Haller in third place.

Teams 

24 teams were selected to take part in the race. Eight of these were UCI WorldTeams; ten were UCI Professional Continental teams; five were UCI Continental teams; and one was a national team.

Results

References

External links 
 

2015 in Italian sport
2015 UCI Europe Tour
2015 Gran Premio Nobili Rubinetterie